Cottage Grove High School is a public high school located in Cottage Grove, Oregon, United States.

History
The new school building, opened in 2003, replacing the old high school building which had been built in 1939 and held its first classes in 1940. The school was originally located at 1000 Taylor Avenue.

Academics
In 2008, 92% of the school's seniors received a high school diploma. Of 195 students, 180 graduated, nine dropped out, three received a modified diploma, and three were still in high school the following year.

Sports

State championships
 Boys 4A state swimming champions a total of 10 times and district/league champions 31 times
 Boys 4A state soccer champions in 2008
 Girls 4A state basketball champions in 2010
 Boys 3A state basketball champions 1991
 3A state cheer champions 1991
4A state football champions 2017

Other extracurricular activities

Notable awards
 Oregon High School Chess State Champions in 2011

References

Educational institutions established in 1940
High schools in Lane County, Oregon
Cottage Grove, Oregon
Public high schools in Oregon
1940 establishments in Oregon